Kieran Rush (born 2002) is a Jamaica international rugby league footballer who plays as a  or  for the Huddersfield Giants in the Betfred Super League.

He has spent time on loan from Huddersfield at the Swinton Lions and the Rochdale Hornets in Betfred League 1.

Background
Rush was born in Dewsbury, West Yorkshire, England. He is of Jamaican descent.

Playing career

Club career
Rush is contracted to the Huddersfield Giants in the Super League.

International career
In 2022 Rush was named in the Jamaica squad for the 2021 Rugby League World Cup. He made his debut in the halves in the Group C match against Ireland at Headingley Rugby Stadium in Leeds, West Yorkshire.
Rush scored a penalty goal to register Jamaica's first ever points in a Rugby League world cup.

References

External links
Huddersfield Giants profile
Jamaica profile

2002 births
Living people
English rugby league players
English people of Jamaican descent
Jamaica national rugby league team players
Rochdale Hornets players
Rugby league hookers
Rugby league players from Dewsbury
Swinton Lions players